Brandon Visher (born May 6, 1984) is a retired Hawaiian mixed martial artist. A professional from 2004 until 2010, he competed in the WEC.

Background
Born and raised in Maui, Visher is a 2002 graduate of King Kekaulike High School, where he competed in wrestling.

Mixed martial arts career

World Extreme Cagefighting
Visher made WEC debut against fellow WEC newcomer Courtney Buck on December 19, 2009 at WEC 45. He won via first-round KO.

Visher suffered the first loss of his professional career to WEC newcomer Tyler Toner by TKO in the first round on April 24, 2010 at WEC 48.

Visher was defeated by Yves Jabouin via unanimous decision on November 11, 2010 at WEC 52.

Mixed martial arts record

|-
|Loss
|align=center|13-3
| Yves Jabouin
|Decision (unanimous)
|WEC 52
|
|align=center|3
|align=center|5:00
|Las Vegas, Nevada, United States
|
|-
|Loss
|align=center|13-2
| Tyler Toner
|TKO (elbows)
|WEC 48
|
|align=center|1
|align=center|2:36
|Sacramento, California, United States
|
|-
|Win
|align=center|13-1
| Courtney Buck
|KO (punches)
|WEC 45
|
|align=center|1
|align=center|4:45
|Las Vegas, Nevada, United States
|
|-
|Win
|align=center|12-1
| Isaac De Jesus
|TKO (punches)
|UNU 3: Visher vs. De Jesus
|
|align=center|3
|align=center|1:00
|Honolulu, Hawaii, United States
|
|-
|Win
|align=center|11-1
| Ed Newalu
|TKO (punches)
|UNU 2 Operation: Fire At Will
|
|align=center|1
|align=center|1:44
|Wailuku, Hawaii, United States
|
|-
|Win
|align=center|10-1
| Tyler Kahihikolo
|Decision (unanimous)
|UNU 1: Seek and Destroy
|
|align=center|3
|align=center|3:00
|Wailuku, Hawaii, United States
|
|-
|Win
|align=center|9-1
| Dave Moreno
|Submission (rear naked choke)
|HW: Hazardous Warfare
|
|align=center|2
|align=center|2:31
|Lahaina, Hawaii, United States
|
|-
|Win
|align=center|8-1
| Ruben del Rosario
|Submission (kimura)
|X-1: Temple of Boom 2
|
|align=center|2
|align=center|N/A
|Honolulu, Hawaii, United States
|
|-
|Loss
|align=center|7-1
| Nick Mamalis
|Decision (Unanimous)
|Kraze in the Cage: Chapter 9
|
|align=center|3
|align=center|5:00
|Rock Springs, Wyoming, United States
|
|-
|Win
|align=center|7-0
| Lorenzo Moreno
|TKO (corner stoppage)
|X-1: Legends
|
|align=center|2
|align=center|5:00
|Honolulu, Hawaii, United States
|
|-
|Win
|align=center|6-0
| Matt Comeau
|Decision
|Hawaii: Xtreme Combat
|
|align=center|3
|align=center|5:00
|Hawaii, United States
|Return to Featherweight.
|-
|Win
|align=center|5-0
| Tyler Kahihikolo
|KO
|FFM 3: Full Force MMA 3
|
|align=center|1
|align=center|4:50
|Maui, Hawaii, United States
|
|-
|Win
|align=center|4-0
| Abraham Cortes-Kaleopaa
|Decision (unanimous)
|FFM 2: Full Force MMA 2
|
|align=center|3
|align=center|3:00
|Maui, Hawaii, United States
|Featherweight bout.
|-
|Win
|align=center|3-0
| Jamar Dumlao
|TKO (injury)
|ROTR: Showdown in Maui
|
|align=center|1
|align=center|1:47
|Maui, Hawaii, United States
|
|-
|Win
|align=center|2-0
| Kevin Delima
|Submission (armbar)
|Ring of Fire 18: River Valley Rumble
|
|align=center|1
|align=center|3:21
|Wailuku, Hawaii, United States
|Lightweight debut.
|-
|Win
|align=center|1-0
| Albert Manners
|TKO (submission to punches)
|WOTR 7: Warriors of the Ring 7
|
|align=center|1
|align=center|2:38
|Wailuku, Hawaii, United States
|

References

External links 

American male mixed martial artists
Mixed martial artists from Hawaii
Featherweight mixed martial artists
Mixed martial artists utilizing wrestling
American male sport wrestlers
Amateur wrestlers
Living people
1984 births